Özlem Conker (born 1 July 1973) is a Turkish actress.

Conker was educated at the Training Center for Special Education Care in the Netherlands. She started her acting career in 1996 by playing a supporting role in the Bizim Ev series. She was first noted by the public in 2001 with her role in the TRT series Vasiyet. She is best known for her roles in the period drama Payitaht: Abdülhamid and the.series Karagül.

Filmography

References

External links 
 

1973 births
Turkish television actresses
Living people
Actresses from Ankara